Abeille Bourbon is a high seas emergency tow vessel (salvage tug),  long with a tractive power of , a crew of 12, designed by Norwegian naval architect  Sigmund Borgundvåg. She was christened by Bernadette Chirac on 13 April 2005 in the presence of sponsor Jacques de Chateauvieux. She is based in Brest, France.

Abeille Bourbon is owned by Abeilles International, a unit of Groupe Bourbon. She is chartered to the French government and can be called upon by the Maritime Prefect of Brest at any time. She was commissioned to replace the older Abeille Flandre, which was reassigned to the French Mediterranean coast.

Abeille Bourbon is a sister ship of Abeille Liberté. Abeille means bee in French. Tow vessels are traditionally named according to their activities around the ships they assist; in this case, like a bee around a flower.

Notable operations 
 Towing Rokia Delmas in October 2006
 Towing MSC Napoli in January 2007
 Towing YM Uranus in October 2010

Gallery

References

External links 

  Abeille Bourbon at Netmarine.net

Tugboats of France
2005 ships
Ships built in Norway